Vikramgad Assembly constituency is one of the 288 Vidhan Sabha (Legislative Assembly) constituencies of Maharashtra state in western India.

Overview
Vikramgad constituency is one of the 6 Vidhan Sabha constituencies located in the Palghar district. It is reserved for the candidates belonging to the Scheduled tribes. It comprises the entire Vikramgad, Jawhar and Mokhada tehsils and part of Wada tehsil of the district.

Vikramgad is part of the Palghar Lok Sabha constituency along with five other Vidhan Sabha segments, namely, Dahanu, Palghar, Boisar, Nalasopara and Vasai in Thane district.

Members of Vidhan Sabha

Election results

2019 result
 Sunil Bhusara (NCP) : 88,425 votes 
 Dr. Hemant Vishnu Savara (BJP) : 67,026

2014 result

2009 result

See also
 Wada Assembly constituency
 List of constituencies of Maharashtra Vidhan Sabha

References

Assembly constituencies of Palghar district
Assembly constituencies of Maharashtra